Lady Fairfax may refer to:

Anne Fairfax (1617/8–1665), English noblewoman and wife of Thomas Fairfax, 3rd Lord Fairfax of Cameron 
Mary Fairfax (1922–2017), Polish-born Australian businesswoman and philanthropist